The Popeye Theater with Mister Mac is a local children's television show that aired on Cleveland's WKYC-TV from 1968 through 1971. The program was hosted by a character named Aloysius T. MacGillicuddy (or Mister Mac), played by Cleveland actor Leif Ancker. 

Mr. Mac lived in a tree and served as the "Commissioner of the Bureau of Elves, Leprechauns and Little People" in the "Department of Utter Confusion." Popeye cartoons were interspersed with comedy sketches featuring Mr. Mac and his upstairs neighbor, Clyde Moose.

References

Local children's television programming in the United States
1960s American children's television series
1970s American children's television series
1968 American television series debuts
1971 American television series endings
American television shows featuring puppetry
Television in Cleveland